Sandra Felgueiras is a Portuguese TV presenter and journalist.

She is best known for interviewing Kate and Gerry McCann about the disappearance of Madeleine McCann.

References

Year of birth missing (living people)
Living people
Portuguese television journalists
Portuguese women journalists